North of Shanghai is a 1939 American drama film directed by D. Ross Lederman.

Cast
 James Craig as Jed Howard
 Betty Furness as Helen Warner
 Keye Luke as Jimmy Riley
 Morgan Conway as Bob Laird
 Joe Downing as Chandler (as Joseph Downing)
 Russell Hicks as Rowley
 Dorothy Gulliver as Sue
 Honorable Wu as Ming
 Dick Curtis as Creighton
 E. Alyn Warren as Leader
 Richard Loo as Jed's Pilot

References

External links
 

1939 films
1939 drama films
American drama films
American black-and-white films
1930s English-language films
Films directed by D. Ross Lederman
Columbia Pictures films
1930s American films
Films with screenplays by Maurice Rapf
English-language drama films